The MNL Myanmar 2013 is the Myanmar National League's fourth full regular season. The fixture schedule was released on third weeks of December 2012. The season is scheduled to begin on 5 January 2013 and end on 25 August 2013. At the end of the 2013 season, the top two teams from the MNL-2 New Holland League will be promoted to the MNL while the two bottom teams from the MNL will be relegated to the MNL-2.

Teams

Personnel and kits

Note: Flags indicate national team as has been defined under FIFA eligibility rules. Players may hold more than one non-FIFA nationality.

League table

Matches

Fixtures and results of the Myanmar National League 2013 season.

Week 1

Week 2

Week 3

Week 4

Week 5

Week 6

Week 7

Week 8

Week 9

Week 10

Week 11

Week 12

Week 13

Week 14

Week 15

Week 16

Week 17

Week 18

Week 19

Week 20

Week 21

Week 22

Results

Season statistics

Top scorers

Hat-tricks

Awards

Monthly awards

References

External links
 Season on soccerway.com

Myanmar National League seasons
1
Myanmar
Myanmar